Francisco Antonio Peña  (born October 12, 1989) is a Dominican professional baseball catcher for the CTBC Brothers of the Chinese Professional Baseball League (CPBL). He has played in Major League Baseball (MLB) for the Kansas City Royals, Baltimore Orioles and St. Louis Cardinals.

Career

New York Mets
Peña signed with the New York Mets as an international free agent in 2007, receiving a $750,000 signing bonus. He made his professional debut with the Savannah Sand Gnats of the Class A South Atlantic League (SAL), where in 103 games, he hit .210 with five home runs, and 30 runs batted in (RBIs). Peña also spent the 2008 season with the Sand Gnats, where in 105 games, he hit .264 with six home runs, 41 RBIs, and 22 doubles. He was named to the SAL All-Star Game as a backup catcher to Jesús Montero. Peña played 2009 with the St. Lucie Mets of the Class A-Advanced Florida State League (FSL), where in 100 games, he hit .224 with eight home runs and 44 RBIs. He was named to the FSL All-Star Game as a backup catcher for Austin Romine. He missed most of 2010 with a broken foot. He made his debut on August 14 in a 10-game rehab assignment in the Gulf Coast League, and on August 26, he returned to St. Lucie, appearing in 10 more games. Peña played 2011 with St. Lucie, where in 95 games, he hit .223 with five home runs and 37 RBIs.

Peña began his fourth season with St. Lucie in 2012. In 41 games with St. Lucie, he hit .254 with four home runs and 22 RBIs. On June 21, he was promoted to the Binghamton Mets of the Class AA Eastern League, where in 40 games, he hit .198 with three home runs and 17 RBIs. He also threw out a career-high 45% of would-be base stealers. Peña began 2013 with Binghamton, where he hit .246 in 21 games before earning a promotion to the Las Vegas 51s of the Class AAA Pacific Coast League on May 18. In 68 games with the 51s, he hit .257 with nine home runs and 39 RBIs. After the season, he became a minor league free agent.

Kansas City Royals

On November 17, 2013, Peña signed with the Kansas City Royals, who added him to their 40-man roster. He competed for a role as a backup catcher to Salvador Pérez. He made his major league debut in May 2014, appearing in one game. He rejoined the Royals in September, but did not appear in a game. After starting the 2015 season in the minor leagues, the Royals promoted Peña to the major leagues on May 6, when Erik Kratz was placed on the disabled list. In 8 Major Leagues games, he had a .143 batting average. The Royals finished the year with a 95–67 record and eventually won the 2015 World Series, their first championship in 30 years. Peña did not play in any postseason games but was in the victory parade.

He was designated for assignment on December 2, 2015.

Baltimore Orioles

On the same day he was designated for assignment by the Royals, Peña was traded to the Baltimore Orioles for cash considerations. He played in 24 games for the Norfolk Tides of the Class AAA International League, before he was promoted to the major leagues on May 31, 2016, while Orioles backup catcher Caleb Joseph went on the disabled list. On June 2, 2016, Peña started and debuted for the Orioles. He went 2 for 4 with 2 RBI and hit his first major league home run to help the Orioles defeat the Red Sox 12–7. Peña ended his 2016 season with a .200 batting average. On February 10, 2017, Peña was designated for assignment.

On May 2, 2017, he was recalled from AAA Norfolk to replace the injured Welington Castillo. Peña was designated for assignment for the third time in 2017 on June 10. He elected free agency on October 3, 2017.

St. Louis Cardinals
On December 13, 2017, Pena signed a minor league contract with the St. Louis Cardinals. He made the active roster as the backup catcher, from a NRI in Spring Training, on March 23, 2018, and will make-up a four-man bench. He elected free agency on November 3, 2018. On December 1, 2018, it was incorrectly reported that the Cardinals resigned Peña to a minor league contract with an invitation to spring training.  This was due to an error on the date of a story reporting the previous year contract.

San Francisco Giants
On May 2, 2019, Pena was traded to the San Francisco Giants in exchange for cash considerations. He was later activated for the organization's AAA affiliate, the Sacramento River Cats, who won the Pacific Coast League and went on to win the 2019 AAA National Championship, being the first time in minor league history a team won 3 titles. Fans and the media alike both considered Pena to be a key factor in the team's championship run, having lead a large part of the team's offensive stats for a majority of the season. Despite winning his first AAA title, he entered free agency following the 2019 season.

Cincinnati Reds
On January 4, 2020, Peña signed a minor league deal with the Cincinnati Reds. He became a free agent on November 2, 2020.

Oakland Athletics
On December 2, 2020, Peña signed a minor league contract with the Oakland Athletics organization.
After the 2020 season, he played for Águilas Cibaeñas of the Dominican Professional Baseball League(LIDOM). He has also played for Dominican Republic in the 2021 Caribbean Series.

CTBC Brothers
On January 12, 2022, Peña signed with the CTBC Brothers of the Chinese Professional Baseball League.

International career
Peña played in the 2013 Caribbean Series and played for the Dominican Republic national baseball team in the 2013 World Baseball Classic.

Personal life
Peña is the son of Tony Peña and the brother of Tony Peña Jr.

Peña also played in the 2001 Little League World Series on the Bronx, New York team, where he was a teammate of the infamous Danny Almonte.

See also
 List of second-generation Major League Baseball players

References

External links

1989 births
Living people
Águilas Cibaeñas players
Baltimore Orioles players
Binghamton Mets players
CTBC Brothers players
Dominican Republic expatriate baseball players in the United States
Dominican Republic expatriate baseball players in Taiwan
Gulf Coast Mets players
Kansas City Royals players
Las Vegas Aviators players
Las Vegas 51s players
Major League Baseball catchers
Major League Baseball players from the Dominican Republic
Memphis Redbirds players
Norfolk Tides players
Omaha Storm Chasers players
Sacramento River Cats players
Savannah Sand Gnats players
Sportspeople from Santo Domingo
St. Louis Cardinals players
St. Lucie Mets players
World Baseball Classic players of the Dominican Republic
2013 World Baseball Classic players